Here is a list of the largest National Wildlife Refuges in the United States. Acreage/Area includes water as well as land areas. Statistics are as of 30 September 2007. The eleven largest National Wildlife Refuges are all in the state of Alaska.

See also
List of National Wildlife Refuges of the United States
List of largest National Forests
List of National Parks of the United States

References

External links
U.S. Fish and Wildlife Service: National Wildlife Refuge System: Find a National Wildlife Refuge by name

!
Wildlife Refuges, Largest
National Wildlife Refuges